

Incumbents
President: Mohamed Morsi (until 3 July), Adly Mansour (starting 4 July)
Prime Minister: Hesham Qandil (until 8 July), Hazem Al Beblawi (starting 9 July)

References